The 57th New York State Legislature, consisting of the New York State Senate and the New York State Assembly, met from January 7 to May 6, 1834, during the second year of William L. Marcy's governorship, in Albany.

Background
Under the provisions of the New York Constitution of 1821, 32 Senators were elected on general tickets in eight senatorial districts for four-year terms. They were divided into four classes, and every year eight Senate seats came up for election. Assemblymen were elected countywide on general tickets to a one-year term, the whole Assembly being renewed annually.

At the time of the state election in 1833, there were three political parties: the Jacksonian Democrats, the Anti-Masonic Party, and the National Republican Party. The latter two parties had formed an Anti-Jacksonian bloc at the previous election.

Elections
The State election was held from November 4 to 6, 1833. State Senators Thomas Armstrong (7th D.) and Albert H. Tracy (8th D.) were re-elected. Leonard Maison (2nd D.), John C. Kemble (3rd D.), Isaac W. Bishop (4th D.), Ebenezer Mack (6th D.); and Assembly Speaker Charles L. Livingston (1st D.) and Assembly Clerk Francis Seger (5th D.) were also elected to the Senate. Tracy was an Anti-Jacksonian, the other seven were Jacksonians.

Sessions
The Legislature met for the regular session at the Old State Capitol in Albany on January 7, 1834; and adjourned on May 6.

William Baker (J) was elected Speaker unopposed.

On February 7, the Legislature re-elected State Treasurer Abraham Keyser, Jr.

On January 15, Assemblyman Samuel S. Bowne introduced "An act to abolish capital punishment, and to provide for the punishment of certain crimes". On March 8, the Assembly rejected the bill, after much debate, with a vote of 49 to 37.

About the time of the New York City election in April 1834, the Anti-Jacksonians assumed the name of Whig Party, and the Jacksonians became the Democratic Party.

The Whig state convention nominated State Senator William H. Seward for governor, and Silas M. Stilwell for lieutenant governor.

The Democratic state convention met on September 10 at Herkimer and nominated Gov. Marcy and Lt. Gov. Tracy for re-election.

State Senate

Districts
 The First District (4 seats) consisted of Kings, New York, Queens, Richmond and Suffolk counties.
 The Second District (4 seats) consisted of Delaware, Dutchess, Orange, Putnam, Rockland, Sullivan, Ulster and Westchester counties.
 The Third District (4 seats) consisted of Albany, Columbia, Greene, Rensselaer, Schenectady and Schoharie counties.
 The Fourth District (4 seats) consisted of Clinton, Essex, Franklin, Hamilton, Montgomery, St. Lawrence, Saratoga, Warren and Washington counties.
 The Fifth District (4 seats) consisted of Herkimer, Jefferson, Lewis, Madison, Oneida and Oswego counties.
 The Sixth District (4 seats) consisted of Broome, Chenango, Cortland, Otsego, Steuben, Tioga and Tompkins counties.
 The Seventh District (4 seats) consisted of Cayuga, Onondaga, Ontario, Seneca, Wayne and Yates counties.
 The Eighth District (4 seats) consisted of Allegany, Cattaraugus, Chautauqua, Erie, Genesee, Livingston, Monroe, Niagara and Orleans counties.

Note: There are now 62 counties in the State of New York. The counties which are not mentioned in this list had not yet been established, or sufficiently organized, the area being included in one or more of the abovementioned counties.

Members
The asterisk (*) denotes members of the previous Legislature who continued in office as members of this Legislature. Charles L. Livingston changed from the Assembly to the Senate.

Employees
 Clerk: John F. Bacon

State Assembly

Districts

 Albany County (3 seats)
 Allegany County (1 seat)
 Broome County (1 seat)
 Cattaraugus County (1 seat)
 Cayuga County (4 seats)
 Chautauqua County (2 seats)
 Chenango County (3 seats)
 Clinton County (1 seat)
 Columbia County (3 seats)
 Cortland County (2 seats)
 Delaware County (2 seats)
 Dutchess County (4 seats)
 Erie County (2 seats)
 Essex County (1 seat)
 Franklin County (1 seat)
 Genesee County (3 seats)
 Greene County (2 seats)
 Hamilton and Montgomery counties (3 seats)
 Herkimer County (3 seats)
 Jefferson County (3 seats)
 Kings County (1 seat)
 Lewis County (1 seat)
 Livingston County (2 seats)
 Madison County (3 seats)
 Monroe County (3 seats)
 The City and County of New York (11 seats)
 Niagara County (1 seat)
 Oneida County (5 seats)
 Onondaga County (4 seats)
 Ontario County (3 seats)
 Orange County (3 seats)
 Orleans County (1 seat)
 Oswego County (1 seat)
 Otsego County (4 seats)
 Putnam County (1 seat)
 Queens County (1 seat)
 Rensselaer County (4 seats)
 Richmond County (1 seat)
 Rockland County (1 seat)
 St. Lawrence County (2 seats)
 Saratoga County (3 seats)
 Schenectady County (1 seat)
 Schoharie County (2 seats)
 Seneca County (2 seats)
 Steuben County (2 seats)
 Suffolk County (2 seats)
 Sullivan County (1 seat)
 Tioga County (2 seats)
 Tompkins County (3 seats)
 Ulster County (2 seats)
 Warren County (1 seat)
 Washington (3 seats)
 Wayne County (2 seats)
 Westchester County (3 seats)
 Yates County (1 seat)

Note: There are now 62 counties in the State of New York. The counties which are not mentioned in this list had not yet been established, or sufficiently organized, the area being included in one or more of the abovementioned counties.

Assemblymen
The asterisk (*) denotes members of the previous Legislature who continued as members of this Legislature.

The party affiliations follow the vote on State officers on February 7 and April 17.

Employees
 Clerk: Philip Reynolds Jr.
 Sergeant-at-Arms: Daniel Dygert
 Doorkeeper: Alonzo Crosby
 Assistant Doorkeeper: Samuel Campbell

Notes

Sources
 The New York Civil List compiled by Franklin Benjamin Hough (Weed, Parsons and Co., 1858) [pg. 109 and 441 for Senate districts; pg. 130 for senators; pg. 148f for Assembly districts; pg. 214ff for assemblymen]
 The History of Political Parties in the State of New-York, from the Ratification of the Federal Constitution to 1840 by Jabez D. Hammond (4th ed., Vol. 2, Phinney & Co., Buffalo, 1850; pg. 435 to 442)

057
1834 in New York (state)
1834 U.S. legislative sessions